The Yamaha RGX and RGZ electric guitars Series are manufactured by the Yamaha Corporation and bear a close resemblance to the Ibanez RG series, the Jackson Soloist and other "superstrat" enhanced copies of the Fender Stratocaster. These Taiwan-made instruments were introduced in 1987.

RGX Series guitars often have 24 or more frets and a bolt-on neck. Some high-end models use a neck-through-body design.  Some come with Yamaha active pickups, in HSS (humbucker/single coil/single coil), HH (dual humbuckers) and HSH (humbucker/single coil/humbucker) configurations.
 
Most of these instruments were generally known as RGZ, including the RGZ820R, a custom green, red and black plaid (often referred to as "watermelon plaid") graphic model with a Floyd Rose licensed TRS Pro locking tremolo and often retrofitted with Seymour Duncan Parallel Axis Trembucker humbucking pickups (though they came with Yamaha-branded pickups), played by rock guitarist Blues Saraceno. 

The RGX guitars were upgraded in 2003 with a 3D headstock sporting a 3+3 tuner layout and a piezo bridge option for acoustic-like tones. Famous endorsees of the RGX/RGZ guitars included Blues Saraceno and Ty Tabor of King's X, who got his namesake RGX-TT and RGX-TTD6 signature models in 2000.

See also
 Yamaha electric guitar models
 Superstrat

References

RGX|RGZ|SG